Libertarian conservatism, also referred to as conservative libertarianism and conservatarianism, is a political and social philosophy that combines conservatism and libertarianism, representing the libertarian wing of conservatism and vice versa.

Libertarian conservatism advocates the greatest possible economic liberty and the least possible government regulation of social life (described as "small government"), mirroring laissez-faire classical liberalism, but harnesses this to a belief in a more socially conservative philosophy emphasizing authority, morality and duty. Primarily in the United States, libertarian conservatism prioritizes liberty, promoting free expression, freedom of choice and free-market capitalism to achieve conservative ends while rejecting liberal social engineering.

Although having similarities to liberal conservatism and therefore mainstream American conservatism with both being influenced by classical liberal thought; libertarian conservatives are far more anti-statist and are much more hostile to government intervention in both social and economic matters.

Overview

Philosophy 
In political science, libertarian conservatism is an ideology that combines the advocacy of economic and legal principles such as fiscal discipline, respect for contracts, defense of private property and free markets, fewer laws banning minor crimes, and the traditional conservative stress on self-help and freedom of choice under a laissez-faire and economically liberal capitalist society with social tenets such as the importance of religion and the value of religious morality through a framework of limited, constitutional, representative government. For Margaret Randall, libertarian conservatism began as an expression of liberal individualism and the demand for personal freedom. According to Andrew Gilbert, conservative parties such as the British Conservative Party and the American Republican Party hold a significant libertarian conservative wing, although Gilbert argues that "it is questionable to what extent conservatism and libertarianism are compatible". According to Mark A. Graber, libertarian conservatives are "philosophically consistent liberal legal individualists".

In 1998, George Wescott Carey edited Freedom and Virtue: The Conservative/Libertarian Debate, a book which contains essays that Carey describes as representing "the tension between liberty and morality" and "the main fault line dividing the two philosophies". For Brian Farmer, "Libertarianism is a form of Conservatism often considered separate from the more mainstream conservative ideologies, partially because it is a bit more extreme, and partially because Libertarians often separate themselves from other forms of more mainstream Conservatism".

In 2004, Thomas DiLorenzo wrote that libertarian conservative constitutionalists believe that the way to limit government is to enforce the United States Constitution. However, DiLorenzo criticized them by writing that "[t]he fatal flaw in the thinking of the libertarian/conservative constitutionalists stems from their unawareness or willful ignorance of how the founders themselves believed the Constitution could be enforced: by the citizens of the free, independent, and sovereign states, not the federal judiciary". DiLorenzo further wrote that the powers accrued to the federal government during the American Civil War overthrew the Constitution of 1787.

In 2006, Nelson Hultberg wrote that there is "philosophical common ground" between libertarians and conservatives. According to Hultberg, "[t]he true conservative movement was, from the start, a blend of political libertarianism, cultural conservatism, and non-interventionism abroad bequeathed to us via the Founding Fathers". He said that such libertarian conservatism was "hijacked" by neoconservatism, "by the very enemies it was formed to fight—Fabians, New Dealers, welfarists, progressives, globalists, interventionists, militarists, nation builders, and all the rest of the collectivist ilk that was assiduously working to destroy the Founders' Republic of States".

Economics 
Libertarian conservatism subscribes to the libertarian idea of free-market capitalism, advocating minimal to no government interference in the market. A number of libertarian conservatives favor Austrian School economics and are critical of fiat money. Libertarian conservatives also support wherever possible privatizing services traditionally run or provided by the government, from airports and air traffic control systems to toll roads and toll booths. Libertarian conservatism advocates economic freedom in the product and capital markets and consumption whilst excluding collective action, collective bargaining and labor organization in general.

History 
In the 1950s, Frank Meyer, a prominent contributor to the National Review, called his own combination of libertarianism and conservatism fusionism.

In a 1975 interview with Reason, California Governor Ronald Reagan appealed to libertarians when he stated to "believe the very heart and soul of conservatism is libertarianism". Ron Paul was one of the first elected officials in the nation to support Reagan's presidential campaign and actively campaigned for Reagan in 1976 and 1980. However, Ron Paul quickly became disillusioned with the Reagan administration's policies after Reagan's election in 1980 and later recalled being the only Republican to vote against Reagan budget proposals in 1981, aghast that "in 1977, Jimmy Carter proposed a budget with a $38 billion deficit, and every Republican in the House voted against it. In 1981, Reagan proposed a budget with a $45 billion deficit—which turned out to be $113 billion—and Republicans were cheering his great victory. They were living in a storybook land". Ron Paul expressed his disgust with the political culture of both major parties in a speech delivered in 1984 upon resigning from the House of Representatives to prepare for a failed run for the Senate and eventually apologized to his libertarian friends for having supported Reagan. By 1987, Ron Paul was ready to sever all ties to the Republican Party as explained in a blistering resignation letter. While affiliated with both Libertarian and Republican parties at different times, Ron Paul stated to have always been a libertarian at heart.

In the 1980s, libertarians such as Ron Paul and Murray Rothbard criticized President Reagan, Reaganomics and policies of the Reagan administration for, among other reasons, having turned the United States' big trade deficit into debt and the United States became a debtor nation for the first time since World War I under the Reagan administration. Rothbard argued that the presidency of Reagan has been "a disaster for libertarianism in the United States" and Ron Paul described Reagan himself as "a dramatic failure".

Already a radical classical liberal and anti-interventionist strongly influenced by the Old Right, especially its opposition to the managerial state whilst being more unequivocally anti-war and anti-imperialist, Rothbard had become the doyen of libertarianism in the United States. After his departure from the New Left, with which he helped build for a few years a relationship with other libertarians, Rothbard had involved the segment of the libertarian movement loyal to him in an alliance with the growing paleoconservative movement, seen by many observers, libertarian and otherwise, as flirting with racism and social reaction. Suggesting that libertarians needed a new cultural profile that would make them more acceptable to socially and culturally conservative people, Rothbard criticized the tendency of proponents of libertarianism to appeal to "'free spirits,' to people who don't want to push other people around, and who don't want to be pushed around themselves" in contrast to "the bulk of Americans", who "might well be tight-assed conformists, who want to stamp out drugs in their vicinity, kick out people with strange dress habits, etc." whilst emphasizing that this was relevant as a matter of strategy. Rothbard argued that the failure to pitch the libertarian message to Middle America might result in the loss of "the tight-assed majority".

In the 1990s, Rothbard, Lew Rockwell and others described their libertarian conservative views as paleolibertarianism. In an early statement of this position, Rockwell and Jeffrey Tucker argued for a specifically Christian libertarianism. Later, Rockwell would no longer consider himself a "paleolibertarian" and was "happy with the term libertarian". Those libertarians continued their opposition to "all forms of government intervention—economic, cultural, social, international" whilst upholding cultural conservatism in social thought and behavior. Paleolibertarians opposed a licentious libertarianism which advocated "freedom from bourgeois morality, and social authority". Rockwell later stated to have dropped that self-description because people confused it with paleoconservatism which libertarians such as Rockwell rejected. While distancing himself from the paleolibertarian alliance strategy, Rockwell affirmed paleoconservatives for their "work on the immigration issue", maintaining that "porous borders in Texas and California" could be seen as "reducing liberty, not increasing it, through a form of publicly subsidized right to trespass".

In 2001, Edward Feser emphasized that libertarianism does not require individuals to reject traditional conservative values. Libertarianism supports the ideas of liberty, privacy and ending the war on marijuana at the legal level without changing personal values. Defending the fusion of traditionalist conservatism with libertarianism and rejecting the view that libertarianism necessarily requires support for a liberal culture, Feser implied that a central issue for those who share his viewpoint is "the preservation of traditional morality—particularly traditional sexual morality, with its idealization of marriage and its insistence that sexual activity be confined within the bounds of that institution, but also a general emphasis on dignity and temperance over self-indulgence and dissolute living".

Hans-Hermann Hoppe is a libertarian conservative, whose belief in rights of property owners to establish private covenant communities, from which homosexuals and political dissidents may be "physically removed", has been strongly criticised. Hoppe also garnered controversy due to his support for restrictive limits on immigration which critics argue is at odds with libertarianism. In Democracy: The God That Failed, first published in 2001, Hoppe argued that "libertarians must be conservatives". Hoppe acknowledged "the importance, under clearly stated circumstances, of discriminating against communists, democrats, and habitual advocates of alternative, non-family centered lifestyles, including homosexuals". In contrast to Walter Block, Hoppe argued that libertarianism need not be seen as requiring open borders and attributed "open border enthusiasm" to "egalitarianism". While defending "market anarchy" in preference to both, Hoppe has argued for the superiority of monarchy to democracy, maintaining that monarchs are likely to be better stewards of the territory they claim to own than democratic politicians, whose time horizons may be shorter.

Notable people 
Richard Epstein, Milton Friedman, Friedrich Hayek, Ludwig von Mises, Albert Jay Nock, Richard Posner, Peter Schiff, Thomas Sowell, David Stockman, Peter Thiel, and Walter E. Williams have been described as libertarian conservatives. Former Congressman Ron Paul and his son Senator Rand Paul have been described as combining conservative and libertarian small government ideas and showing how the Constitution of the United States defends the individual and most libertarian views. Barry Goldwater who furthered conservatism in America was a libertarian conservative.

Ivan Reitman, the director of Ghostbusters, described his political views as "conservative-slash-libertarian".

See also 

 Anti-Federalism
 Chicago school of economics
 Democracy promotion
 Empire of Liberty
 Fiscal conservatism
 Freedom Caucus
 Jeffersonian democracy
 Libertarianism and Objectivism
 Libertarian perspectives on foreign intervention
 Libertarian Republican
 Liberty Caucus
 Neo-libertarianism
 Paleolibertarianism
 Republican Liberty Caucus
 Supply-side economics
 Tea Party movement
 Western conservatism

References

Bibliography

Further reading 
 Ashford, Nigel; Davies, Stephen (2012). A Dictionary of Conservative and Libertarian Thought (Routledge Revivals). London: Routledge. .
 Blanchette, Jude (October 27, 2004). "What Libertarians and Conservatives Say About Each Other: An Annotated Bibliography". LewRockwell.com. Retrieved September 23, 2020.
 Hoppe, Hans-Hermann (2014). "A Realistic Libertarianism is Right (Conservative) Libertarianism". Mises Institute. Retrieved September 23, 2020.
 Rothbard, Murray (1981). "Frank S. Meyer: The Fusionist as Libertarian Manqué". Modern Age. Retrieved September 23, 2020 – via LewRockwell.com.

External links 
 Republican Liberty Caucus. A group of libertarian conservatives.

Conservatism in the United States
Conservatism
Conservatism
Republican Party (United States)
Conservatism